Prabjhote Kaur "Jyoti" Gondek (born 1969) is a Canadian politician serving as the 37th and current mayor of Calgary since October 25, 2021.

Early life and education 
Born in London, England, Gondek is the daughter of Indian Punjabi Sikh parents Jasdev Singh Grewal, a lawyer, and Surjit Kaur Grewal. She immigrated to Canada with her parents at age four, initially settling in Manitoba.

Gondek pursued a bachelor's degree in criminology and sociology from the University of Manitoba, where she worked as a policy analyst with the government of Manitoba before moving to Calgary, where she worked in sales and marketing for the Credit Union of Central Alberta. Gondek pursued a master's degree in organizational sociology during a two-year stint at Greyhound.

She founded a strategic planning and communications consultancy, Tick Consulting, while pursuing a PhD in urban sociology at the University of Calgary, where she also taught and eventually directed a real-estate studies initiative at the university's Haskayne School of Business. Gondek was a member of the Calgary Planning Commission from 2012 to 2016. Gondek's successfully deposited her  dissertation in 2014. It was called Pressures of Hybridity: An analysis of Urban-Rural Nexus. it offered a case study of Rocky View County, a municipality that shares both rural and urban features. Rocky View County surrounds most of Calgary, forming the city's northern boundary and most of the city's western and eastern boundaries.

Political career 
From 2017 to 2021 she was the councillor for Ward 3, which includes the communities of, Carrington, Country Hills, Country Hills Village, Coventry Hills, Harvest Hills, and Panorama Hills. Ward 3 is in the NW region of Calgary. Prior to her term as a city councillor, Gondek sat as a citizen member of the city's planning commission.

In 2021, it was reported that in 2013, Gondek's consultancy was hired by the Urban Development Institute, a special interest group for the development industry in Calgary, to influence public opinion in favour of urban sprawl. This, along with the fact that contributions from developers made up 47% of her donations in the 2017 municipal election—above the average of 35%—made her the subject of controversy.

Mayor of Calgary 
On October 18, 2021, she was elected the 37th mayor of Calgary. Gondek was sworn in along with the incoming city council on October 25, 2021, becoming the first female mayor in the city's history.

During the swearing-in ceremony for the new City Council, Gondek refused to swear in Sean Chu, who was embroiled in a scandal following allegations of impropriety with a minor while he was a member of the Calgary Police Service. Gondek attended a rally calling for Chu's resignation.

On March 29, 2022, a poll by ThinkHQ Public Affairs pegged Gondek's approval rating at 38%, with 53% of respondents disapproving and the remaining 9% unsure. The unusually low approval rating in the first few months of her mayoral tenure has been attributed to the failed Calgary Event Centre deal, a four percent tax increase, and the COVID-19 pandemic, including the related protests in the Beltline neighbourhood. Gondek responded to the poll, saying it was a "data point at a very specific point in time," and reflective of residents' frustrations with the uncertain economy caused by the pandemic.

References 

Living people
British people of Indian descent
British people of Punjabi descent
British Sikhs
English people of Indian descent
English people of Punjabi descent
English Sikhs
British emigrants to Canada
English emigrants to Canada
Canadian people of Indian descent
Canadian people of Punjabi descent
Canadian Sikhs
Canadian politicians of Indian descent
Canadian politicians of Punjabi descent
University of Calgary alumni
Canadian sociologists
Canadian women sociologists
Urban sociologists
Calgary city councillors
University of Manitoba alumni
Mayors of Calgary
Politicians from London
Women mayors of places in Alberta
Women municipal councillors in Canada
1969 births
21st-century Canadian politicians
21st-century Canadian women politicians